St. Anthony's Boys' School is an English medium school in Bangalore, Karnataka, India.

History

The school was founded in 1913 by a French Missionary Rev. Fr. Servanton.  He served the parish and the school from 1898-1948.

When the school was established in 1913, there were only two dedicated masters, Mr. Thambu who was the head master himself and Mr. Thangam who assisted him. The start was made only with a few students and the classes were conducted in the present parish hall which was an old and small library then. The school had no buildings of its own.

Rev. Msgr. I. B. Pinto took the initiative and responsibility of putting up a permanent structure, without any financial backing and shouldering all the financial constrains. It was in 1950 that St. Anthony's Primary School had a permanent ground floor. Rev. Fr. Anthony Sequeira took over and obtained a grant and approval for appointments in the department. During this period the number of staff also grew in size.

Miss B. T. Sakku was appointed as Headmistress in 1955, served the school almost 35 years. To meet the increasing demand of the students, she succeeded in getting departmental approval to open classes 6 and 7 in the year 1959 and also additional sections to classes 1 to 7. The Present Headmistress Mrs. J. Sagayamary was appointed in 1976 as an Asst. Mistress and posted as Graduate Headmistress in 1992. She has rendered her service for almost 37 years.

Logos

The school logo incorporates the motto and has four symbols engraved in middle shield with significance as below:

 The BOOK signifies the Excellence in Knowledge.
 The Lotus Bud signifies the growth of every student in Life like the National Flower Lotus from Bud to full blossom.
 The Excellence in sports is highlighted with the symbols like Football, Hockey Stick, Ball, again importance provided to the national Sport Hockey.
 The Lamp Signifies the enlightenment of the student with Knowledge attained in the school.

A new logo was created as part of the 100 years Celebration in the year 2014. the Traditional logo was updated with addition of 10 stars signifying 10 decades of School's service. A highlighted Label with 100 years Engraved was added on the bottom to commemorate the Special occasion.

Facilities
The school has 2 Blocks as part of "St. Anthony's Higher Primary School" and "St. Anthony's Boys High School".

First Block houses Classes I to VII with two floors containing class rooms, an assembly area, a computer lab, and an auditorium.

Second Block houses Classes VIII to X with class rooms, a sports room, a laboratory, and a library.

References

External links

 

Christian schools in Karnataka
Primary schools in Karnataka
High schools and secondary schools in Bangalore
Educational institutions established in 1913
1913 establishments in India